Henry Forero Ramírez Ordinola (born 3 June 1980) is a Peruvian football defender.

Career
Born in Sullana, Ramírez played professional football for local club Alianza Atlético. He joined Copa Peru participants Cultural Volante (Bambamarca) in 2011 and José Olaya (Sechura) in 2012.

References

External links
Profile at BDFA.com.ar
Profile at Peru.com

1980 births
Living people
People from Piura Region
Peruvian footballers
Alianza Atlético footballers
Association football defenders